Poklek pri Podsredi is a small settlement west of Podsreda in the Municipality of Kozje in eastern Slovenia. It was traditionally part of Styria. The municipality is now included in the Savinja Statistical Region.

Name
The name of the settlement was changed from Poklek to Poklek pri Podsredi in 1953.

References

External links
Poklek pri Podsredi on Geopedia

Populated places in the Municipality of Kozje